Dave Keane is a children's book author and illustrator who lives and works in Northern California.

His books include:
Bobby Bramble Loses His Brain, 
Sloppy Joe,   
Daddy Adventure Day, 
Monster School, 
Joe Sherlock: Kid Detective series, Book 1,

References

External links
 

American children's writers
American children's book illustrators
Writers from California
1965 births
Living people
Place of birth missing (living people)
Artists from California